Sagredo is a surname. It may refer to:

Boris Sagredo (born 1989), Chilean footballer
Caterina Sagredo Barbarigo (1715–1772), Italian noble and salon holder
Gerard Sagredo (980–1046), Italian Benedictine monk
Giovanni Francesco Sagredo (1571–1620), Italian mathematician; friend of Galileo Galilei
Nicolò Sagredo (1606–1676), Italian Doge (Venice)
Ramón Sagredo (1834–1873), Mexican painter and photographer